Margret Borgs (later Mund, February 17, 1909 – May 4, 1993) was a German diver who competed in the 1928 Summer Olympics. She was the wife of Arthur Mund and the mother of Günther Mund and Lilo Mund.

In 1928 she finished fifth in the 3 metre springboard event. In the 10 metre platform competition she was eliminated in the first round.

References

External links
 

1909 births
1993 deaths
German female divers
Olympic divers of Germany
Divers at the 1928 Summer Olympics
20th-century German women